Todd is a surname meaning "fox" (from Old English todde), and may refer to:

People
 Ada Josephine Todd (1858–1904), American author and educator
 Albert E. Todd, Canadian mayor
 Albert M. Todd, US Representative from Michigan
 Alexander Todd (rugby player), English and British Isles rugby union international 
 Alexander R. Todd, Baron Todd, Nobel laureate in chemistry
 Alison Todd, Australian scientist
 Alpheus Todd (1821–1884), English-born Canadian librarian and constitutional historian
 Andrew Todd (New Zealand), New Zealand businessman.
 Andy Todd (disambiguation), multiple people
 Ann Todd (1907–1993), British actress
 Armstrong Todd, MD (1826–1873), nineteenth century English surgeon
 Barbara Euphan Todd, English writer
 Beth Todd, American engineer
 Beverly Todd, American actress
 Bill Todd, NASA program manager and aquanaut
 Bob Todd, British actor
 Bob Todd (baseball), American college baseball coach
 Brendon Todd, American professional golfer
 Brent Todd, New Zealand rugby league footballer
 Bryan Todd (disambiguation), several people
 Caroline and Charles Todd, American mystery novelists
 Charles Todd (astronomer), Australian astronomer
 Charles Todd (industrialist), New Zealand businessman
 Charles Burr Todd, American historian
 Charles Lafayette Todd, American folklorist
 Charles Hawkes Todd, MD (1784–1826), Irish physician and president of the Royal College of Surgeons
 Chris Todd, English footballer
 Christine Todd Whitman, American politician
 Chuck Todd, American television host
 Colin Todd, English football player and manager
 David Todd (architect), American architect
 David Peck Todd, American astronomer
 Deborah Todd, American game designer, writer, and producer
  Dolley Payne Todd, birthname of Dolley Madison, wife of President James Madison
 Emmanuel Todd, French sociologist
 Frederick Todd, landscape architect
 Garfield Todd, South Rhodesian politician
 Geoff Todd, Australian artist
 Hallie Todd, American actress
 H. E. Todd (Herbert Eatton Todd, 1908–1988), English children's writer
Helen M. Todd (1870–1953), American suffragist and activist
 Henry Todd (priest) (1763–1845), English clergyman
 Henry Alfred Todd (1854–1925), American scholar
 J. A. Todd (John Arthur Todd, 1908–1994), British mathematician
 Jackson Todd, former Major League Baseball pitcher
 James Todd (Canadian settler), Canadian settler in British Columbia
 James Henthorn Todd (1805–1869), Irish scholar
 Jane H. Todd (1890–1966), New York politician
 Janet Todd, British writer and biographer
 Jim Todd, American basketball coach
 John Todd (disambiguation), multiple people
 Joseph Todd, American football player
 Josh Todd (musician), American singer
 Kathleen Todd, pioneering New Zealand child psychiatrist.
 Kathryn Doi Todd, first female Asian American judge in the United States
 Keeley Todd, New Zealand cricketer
 Kendra Todd, American reality TV winner
 Lance Todd, New Zealand-born British rugby league personality
 Lani Todd, American model
 Larry Todd (b. 1948), American illustrator and cartoonist
 Laurence Todd (1882–1957), American press correspondent
 Lemuel Todd, US Representative from Pennsylvania
 Malcolm Todd, British historian
 Margaret Todd (disambiguation), multiple people
 Mark Todd (disambiguation), multiple people
 Mary Todd Lincoln, First Lady of the United States
 Mia Doi Todd, American musician
 Michael Todd (disambiguation), multiple people
 Mort Todd, American humorist
 Olga Taussky Todd, Austrian-American mathematician
 Pat Canning Todd, American tennis player
 Patricia Todd, American politician from Alabama
 Paul H. Todd, Jr., US Representative from Michigan
 Paula Todd, Canadian journalist
 Peta Todd, a former English glamour girl
 Peter Todd, Canadian academic administrator
 Petra Todd, American economist
 Robert Todd (disambiguation), multiple people
 Richard Todd (1919–2009), British actor
 Richard Todd (football player), American football player
 Rick Todd, Canadian professional golfer
 Roland Todd (1900–1969), English boxer of the 1910s, and 1920s
 Ron Todd, British union leader
 Ron Todd (footballer), Collingwood FC footballer.
 Ruthven Todd, Scottish poet
 Thelma Todd, American actress
 Thomas Todd, American judge
 Tony Todd, American actor
 Tweedy John Todd, (1789–1840) British biologist and physician
 W. Russell Todd (1928-22023), United States Army officer
 Walker Todd (ca. 1786–1840), New York politician
 Walter Edmond Clyde Todd (1874–1969), American ornithologist
 William Todd (disambiguation), multiple people

Fictional characters
 Caitlin Todd, character on NCIS
 Jason Todd, a character in DC Universe
 Sweeney Todd, a character in 19th century popular literature
 Ursula Todd, a character in  Life After Life  by  Kate Atkinson
 Warwick Todd, fictional cricketer created by Tom Gleisner

See also
 Todd (disambiguation)
 Todt (disambiguation)
 Toddy (disambiguation)

English-language surnames